The presumption of priestly descent (or presumed kohen or status-quo kohen) in Judaism is the attribution to a kohen of equivalent position as if there was proven descent from the priestly family of Aaron. This is evidenced not by genealogical records but by de facto priestly behavior as defined in rabbinical halakhic texts.

In the Land of Israel it was the raising up of hands in the priestly benediction, and sharing heave offering at the threshing floor, whereas in Syria and Babylonia the raising up of hands constituted adequate grounds, but not sharing heave offering at the threshing floor as stated in the Jerusalem Talmud Ketubot 2:7 and other texts.

The "presumed kohen" (kohen mukhzaq) (from חזק) is a rabbinic title which legitimates kohen status to a kohen who—among multiple criteria—exhibits conduct exemplary of and is recognized by his peers and community as such.

The tannaitic rabbi Jose ben Halafta extolled the soundness of the said "presumption" (chazakah) by calling it a basis for the entire halakhic concept of chazakah (B.Ketubot 24b). It is based on this presumption that all poskim agree, unanimously, to forbid presumptive kohanim from marrying a divorcee. Of note is that from among the opinions of the Acharonim, the mentioned presumption is given the title "a sound presumption".

According to Maimonides, once he is established as a presumptive kohen it is a commandment to sanctify the kohen and assist him in abstaining from the prohibitions that apply to a kohen. Maimonides considered that presumption of the kohen is deemed valid and in good standing unless a valid objection to his lineage is made before a Beit Din.

In the Hebrew Bible
From the time of Aaron being chosen as High Priest up to the times of the Babylonian exile the lineage of a kohen was taken as matter-of-fact. This changed by the onset of the Jewish nation's returning from Babylonian exile and the building of the temple anew. This national revival created a call for the kohanim to do their necessary priestly duty on the temple. However, due to the occurrence of intermarriage among the returnees in general and the kohanim as well, the need to ascertain that each kohen was lineage verifiable as being a male descendant, 'son after son', also termed 'a paternal grandchild', of Aaron the High Priest and kosher in the literal sense; "in line" with the directives of the Law', for example not an offspring of a forbidden marriage such as if a kohen were to marry a divorcee where the child would be disqualified from the priesthood.

This necessity created an investigation ordered by Nehemiah that produced the first recorded investigation questioning the authenticity of apparently legitimate kohanim:

By first glance at the above verse it is understood that the mentioned families were rejected entirely from all duties and privileges exclusive to the kohanim. However, the Tanna Rabbi Yossi adopted a more analytical approach based on the following verse:

Based on the latter verse making explicit what these persons may not eat from the most holy things it is apparent that consumption of simply holy things was allowed. Yossi gives the opinion that since the investigated families had prior to the investigation consumed only offerings from outside the Holy Land, from the point of investigative results and onward they were permitted to eat from offerings of the Land of Israel (Ketubot 24b). He further explains that offerings from outside the Holy Land are prohibited to a non-kohen based on rabbinic command whereas offerings from the Holy Land are prohibited to a non-kohen by a direct Biblical directive. From the apparent unpleasant narrated event of the Beit Din of Nehemiah questioning the legitimacy of the mentioned Kohanic family, Yossi extracted the positive factor of the strength of the Chazakah form of ownership.

Yossi understood this from the fact that not only did Nehemiah allow the said kohanic family to consume the Terumah from outside of the Land of Israel but also allowed them to consume Terumah from Israel itself—an act punishable by death if performed by a non-kohen.

As to why the investigators of Nehemiah were suspicious that the priestly family of the children of Chavaya were not qualified to function as kohanim is a matter of Talmudic and rabbinic debate.

The author of Avodah Tamma points out that this family was known to be descendants of Aaron for certain, the suspicion was that these male children were offspring of a woman forbidden to a kohen for marriage.

The Talmud Yerushalmi explains that Barzilai himself was a Jew, but his daughters were not born Jewish but converted before being three years of age, posing a (rabbinic) problem to a kohen marrying those daughters.

In discussing the reason as to why the verse chooses to penn the known lineage of the questioned kohanim as being descendants of Barzilai the Gileadite, the 13th century Talmudic scholar, Menachem Meiri points out the wording of the verse transmit a unique message.

Barzilai the Gileadite, explained the Meiri, was reputed by Talmudic scholars to be a person of excessive sexual indulgence. Additionally, Barzilai was suspected as a common liar and entirely not versed in Torah law. These facts, Menachem concludes, is why the verse chose to tell us this seemingly unimportant detail, since it was who these kohanim chose to marry that was the source of the unpleasant outcome of being the subject of investigation.

In any case both according to Talmud Bavli and Yerushalmi, the root cause for suspicion of these kohanim was only MiDirabbanan, and therefor at the conclusion of the investigation this Kohanic family was permitted to consume Terumah.

Lineage document
As to the essential content of the lineage document—and its general appearance—little information is given by the Talmud. This being contrary to other Rabbinic documents that are described at somewhat greater length, for example the Ketubah, the Get, various business documents (Shtarei Kinyan), and the document of freedom for a bondsman (Shtar Shichrur).

Rashi, in his Torah commentary mentions that when the congregation of Israel were required to ascertain their lineage to join their respective tribe, this document was brought in tandem with the testifying of witnesses. In the book of Divrei HaYamim, the lineage document is usually cited in relation to the soldiers of Israel joining their respective legions based on their patrilineal tribe.

Yair Bacharach noted that the lineage document was not commonly used by kohanim. To be deemed eligible for Kohanic service, explained Yair, is sufficient that two Kosher witnesses testify that the said kohen is of legitimate lineage. The Tur Shulchan Aruch follows a similar tone by stating that to be eligible for Kohanic service on the Mizbeach two witnesses is sufficient. According to the opinion of the Avodah Tamma, the option was available for the incoming kohen to either produce his lineage document or have two Kosher witnesses testify to his authenticity as a kohen.

During the Temple period
As to who was appointed to verify the lineage of the kohanim during this pre-temple era is a matter of debate. The Mishnah state that, as part of the Great Beit Din, there was a branch-commission occupied exclusively with this investigative task. While the Sifri and Babylonian Talmud point out that it was a commission of kohanim themselves that investigated the legitimacy of fellow kohanim.

Accurate lineage keeping in the Diaspora
With the destruction of the Second Temple and the Jews entry to exile hard-copy lineage recording was lost. In its stead came the actions exclusive to kohanim and the absence of a disqualifying objection in Beit Din that expressed that one was a legitimate kohen.

Based on a lengthy and highly-analytical responsum by the composer of the Sdei Chemed, Rabbi Chaim Hezekiah Medini concluded that the modern Kohen Muchzak is considered a valid and true kohen for all purposes that a kohen is to fulfill.

Responsum of Isaac ben Sheshet (1328–1408)
The source of questioning the legitimacy of kohanim is rooted in a single responsum of Isaac ben Sheshet.  This fourteenth-century responsum deals with a letter to Rabbi Yitzchok detailing an event where an individual publicly humiliated a kohen. The query was as to whether it is halachic to impose an increased monetary fine to the humiliator since the subjected was a kohen, or to suffice with the standard fine afforded a non-kohen.

Rabbi Yitzchok responded that "Although it is halacha that he who humiliates another by use of words is not liable, one who embarrasses a Kohen should be publicly rebuked and subject to request forgiveness from and to appease the Kohen — so long as the Kohen exhibits conduct expected from a son of Aaron". Isaac ben Sheshet continued and negated amplifying the penalty since the embarrassed kohen was not a learned Talmid Chacham kohen, but an unschooled am ha-aretz kohen. Ben Sheshet explained that even were the regular kohen to produce a lineage document certifying his direct lineage to Aaron the high priest the halachic ruling would stay, since it is found in the Talmud that the rabbis did not withhold from humiliating a "lineage-verified kohen" who was not well-versed in Torah (Am Haaretz) all the more so today's kohen who cannot produce his lineage document does not receive an amplified penalty". Of note is that the Shulchan Aruch (Tur Choshen Mishpat 420:24) rules that the humiliator of a kohen is liable to pay amplified compensation.

Isaac ben Sheshet's words "today's Kohen who cannot produce his lineage document", which he intended on using as a sidebar explanation to his final ruling of standard compensation, over time evolved into an underpinning foundation for Poskim who sought to approve rabbinically-questionable marriages to a kohen.

Understanding Isaac ben Sheshet's response
Leading Rabbinic authorities, such as Joseph Trani and Samuel Ashkenazi, disputed reliance on the Isaac ben Sheshet's response for purpose of questioning the authenticity of the kohen. They, as part of various proofs, cited reasoning from a latter response from Isaac ben Sheshet himself (Tshuvat HaRivash res. 348) where he is stringent that a kohen who married a divorcee is obligated to cease his marriage, thus proving the Isaac ben Sheshet's fundamental stance of upholding the legitimacy of the presumptive kohen.

Rabbi Samuel de Medina's permission
Rabbi Samuel de Medina, in a response concerning a woman who was held captive as a young girl, ruled that a kohen is permitted to marry her. The logic, he explained, is one of a double uncertainty. One uncertainty being that we are unsure the woman was exposed to forced intimacy, which would disqualify the woman from marrying a kohen, and even where she have been the kohen is prohibited from wedding her only according to rabbinical decision. In addition, the Samuel de Medina wrote that he is unsure as to the authenticity of the modern kohen based on the response of the Isaac ben Sheshet.

This responsum of Samuel de Medina was met with a fiery reply from Ezekiel Katzenellenbogen;

Rabbinic authorities such as Joseph Trani have come to the defense of Samuel de Medina by stating that the case brought before his court was one of Rabbinic degree, and never would Samuel de Medina have permitted a marriage prohibited in the Hebrew Bible marriage to presumptive kohen. They cite, as proof, additional responsa of Samuel where he is stringent on a presumptive kohen from continued marriage to his wife due to only the possible but not certain receipt of a bill of divorce.

Opinion of Solomon Luria
The opinion of Solomon Luria is somewhat obscure.  On the one hand Luria opines with the advice to give the "devoted things", both land and goods, as one of the ten priestly gifts applicable outside of Israel, to a presumptive kohen, provided the estate owner of the devoted property explicitly states to give it to a kohen. Luria also encouraged the giving of shoulder, cheeks and maw to a presumptive kohen.
However, Luria writes of the basic questioning of the kohen as legitimate due to upheaval of the Khmelnytsky Uprising, writing that this and similar upheavals utterly confused the entire lineage tracking of Jews subjected to persecution in Europe.

Story about Elijah
Luria quotes a story where Hai ben Sherira, Hai Gaon practiced a minhag to travel to Jerusalem for Sukkot and circle the Temple Mount with hundreds of kohanim with the company of Elijah the Prophet. One year a student of his noticed rav Hai laughing during the procession, at the completion of the procession he queried his rabbi as to why, to which rav Hai responded that Elijah revealed to him that, from among the hundreds of kohanim that accompanied him in a haughty way, none were legitimate kohanim aside for one kohen who proceeded humbly.

Questioning the story
Luria although quoting the story as one "known amongst the works of Rabbinic leaders" was not one of great familiarity amongst rabbinic writers.  The story was eventually traced by scholars to have originated in the Parma manuscript of Sefer Chasidim, a manuscript with multiple textual differences to the common edition of "Sefer Chasidim." However, in addition to the story detail creating an anachronism of sorts in that the story portrays rav Hai and Evyathar Kohen-Tzedek as proceeding together in Jerusalem whereas they lived at separate times, some scholars have labeled the story as a Karaite forgery.

Others maintain that the story detail falls in line with the opinion spelled out by Hai Gaon in his letter to the priests of Djerba, where Hai expresses that humility is a proper virtue of the kohen and the kohen who does not possess this attribute is of questionable priestly lineage

Opposition to Luria
Luria's Talmudic explanation that put a damper on the legitimacy of Jewish priests was not readily accepted amongst some poskim. Some cited Luria's reasoning as "a feeble enough reason", while others validated Luria's reasoning solely outside of Israel. Some even went so far as to legitimize Luria's reasoning only to disqualify Ashkenazic priesthood while stating that Sephardic priesthood is of superior quality. The Chatam Sofer rejected Luria's reasoning that the lineage of Ashkenazic priesthood was utterly confused.

Opinion of Jacob Emden
Regarding the commandment of giving the five silver coins of the firstborn to the kohen. Jacob Emden opined that the presumed status of a presumptive kohen is insufficient to merit actually keeping those five silver coins.  Hence, he suggested the kohen agree to a conditional transaction, with the intent on returning the coins to the father of the firstborn, all this in order to skirt the potential prohibition of theft on the kohen's part.

Numerous Poskim, however, did not agree with Emden on this issue, for example, Sofer wrote that this type of conditional transaction would invalidate the redemption of the firstborn itself and the child would not be halachically redeemed so long as any pressure is exerted on the kohen to agree to this type of conditional transaction. A more extreme approach was taken by Chaim Hezekiah Medini who exclaimed, amongst a group of arguments, that Emden's advice created a cloud of uncertainty and doubt as to the otherwise legitimate lineage of the modern kohen. Medini concluded that the Emden's idea should not be relied on for the actual redemption of the firstborn.

In regards to the lineage of a kohen, Emden, in another responsum, writes that it is possible to find a kohen with a lineage document up until his patrilinial priestly division in hand even though the rest of Israel do not have their lineage documents at all.

Table of Halakhic opinions

See also
 613 commandments
 Y-chromosomal Aaron

References

External links 
 Sdei Chemed responsa (English translation) discussing halachic validity of kohanim without their lineage document – Kehuna.org

Priesthood (Judaism)
Jewish religious occupations